Alastor xerxes is a species of wasp in the family Vespidae found in the Hormozgan province of Iran.

References

xerxes

Insects of Iran